Nepheloleuca complicata, the swallow-tailed moth, is a moth in the  family Geometridae. It is found in Cuba, Jamaica and Haiti and from Panama to Peru. The habitat consists of lowland rainforests and mid-elevation cloudforests up to altitudes of about 1,800 metres.

References

Moths described in 1994
Ourapterygini